Scott Township is an active township in Taney County, in the U.S. state of Missouri.

Scott Township was founded in 1839, taking its name from the local Scott family.

References

Townships in Missouri
Townships in Taney County, Missouri